Smoky Dome, at  above sea level is the highest peak in the Soldier Mountains of Idaho.  Smoky Dome is located northwest of Fairfield in Camas County and Sawtooth National Forest.

Views from the summit encompass the Pioneer, Smoky, and Trinity Mountains as well as the Bennett Hills.

The primary route to Smoky Dome begins just north of the Soldier Mountain Ski Area and heads west up and old dirt road that is now trail 087.  The route then turns onto trail 185 as it crosses the South Fork of Soldier Creek.  Once on the ridge above the ski area, follow the trail along the ridge until it ends below and to the northeast of the second peak.  Continue to follow the ridge up the second and third peaks until you reach Smoky Dome.  There are numerous other routes possible.

The northern slopes of Smoky Dome are drained by Boardman Creek, a tributary of the South Fork Boise River.  The four Smoky Dome Lakes, Lower, Upper 1, Upper 2, and West Smoky Dome Lakes are northwest of the peak. Boardman Peak and Iron Mountain are both northwest of Smoky Dome.

References

External links 
 Fairfield Ranger District trip report
 Sawtooth National Forest - Official Site

Mountains of Idaho
Mountains of Camas County, Idaho
Sawtooth National Forest